Chimtay was a ruler of White Horde between 1344 and 1360. 

When his son or relative, Urus (future khan), urged him to take throne of the Golden Horde, utilizing the great troubles. He refused but sent his brother Ordu Sheykh who was later on killed in the Horde. He died in 1360.

Genealogy
Genghis Khan
Jochi
Orda Khan
Sartaqtay
Köchü
Bayan
Sasibuqa
Ilbasan
Chimtay

See also
List of Khans of the Golden Horde

Nomadic groups in Eurasia
Khans of the White Horde
14th-century Mongol rulers
Borjigin
1360 deaths
Year of birth unknown